Karşıköy can refer to:

 Karşıköy, Borçka
 Karşıköy, Mudurnu